Assamese, also Asamiya, is an Indo-Aryan language spoken mainly in the north-eastern Indian state of Assam, where it is an official language, and it serves as a lingua franca of the wider region. The easternmost Indo-Iranian language, it has over 15 million speakers according to Ethnologue.

Nefamese, an Assamese-based pidgin, is used in Arunachal Pradesh, and Nagamese, an Assamese-based Creole language, is widely used in Nagaland. The Kamtapuri language of Rangpur division of Bangladesh and the Cooch Behar and Jalpaiguri districts of India are linguistically closer to Assamese, though the speakers identify with the Bengali culture and the literary language. In the past, it was the court language of the Ahom kingdom from the 17th century.

Along with other Eastern Indo-Aryan languages, Assamese evolved at least before the 7th century CE from the middle Indo-Aryan Magadhi Prakrit. Its sister languages include Angika, Bengali, Bishnupriya Manipuri, Chakma, Chittagonian, Hajong, Rajbangsi, Maithili, Rohingya and Sylheti. It is written in the Assamese alphabet, an abugida system, from left to right, with many typographic ligatures.

History

Assamese originated in Old Indo-Aryan dialects, though the exact nature of its origin and growth is not clear yet. It is generally believed that Assamese and the Kamatapuri lects derive from the Kamarupi dialect of Eastern Magadhi Prakrit though some authors contest a close connection of Assamese with Magadhi Prakrit. The Indo-Aryan, which appeared in the 4th-5th century in Assam, was probably spoken in the new settlements of Kamarupa—in urban centers and along the Brahmaputra river—surrounded by Tibeto-Burman and Austroasiatic communities. Kakati's (1941) assertion that Assamese has an Austroasiatic substrate is generally accepted – which suggests that when the Indo-Aryan centers formed in the 4th-5th centuries CE, there were substantial Austroasiatic speakers that later accepted the Indo-Aryan vernacular. Based on the 7th-century Chinese traveler Xuanzang's observations,  suggests that the Indo-Aryan vernacular differentiated itself in Kamarupa before it did in Bengal, and that these differences could be attributed to non-Indo-Aryan speakers adopting the language. The newly differentiated vernacular, from which Assamese eventually emerged, is evident in the Prakritisms present in the Sanskrit of the Kamarupa inscriptions.

Magadhan and Gauda-Kamarupa stages
The earliest forms of Assamese in literature are found in the 9th-century Buddhist verses called Charyapada the language of which bear affinities with Assamese (as well as Bengali and Odia) and which belongs to a period when the Prakrit was at the cusp of differentiating into regional languages. The spirit and expressiveness of the Charyadas are today found in the folk songs called Deh-Bicarar Git.

In the 12th-14th century works of Ramai Pundit (Sunya Puran), Boru Chandidas (Krishna Kirtan), Sukur Mamud (Gopichandrar Gan), Durllava Mullik (Gobindachandrar Git) and Bhavani Das (Mainamatir Gan) Assamese grammatical peculiarities coexist with features from Bengali language. Though the Gauda-Kamarupa stage is generally accepted and partially supported by recent linguistic research, it has not been fully reconstructed.

Early Assamese

A distinctly Assamese literary form appeared first in the 13th-century in the courts of the Kamata kingdom when Hema Sarasvati composed the poem Prahrāda Carita. In the 14th-century, Madhava Kandali translated the Ramayana into Assamese (Saptakanda Ramayana) in the court of Mahamanikya, a Kachari king from central Assam. Though the Assamese idiom in these works is fully individualised, some archaic forms and conjunctive particles too are found. This period corresponds to the common stage of proto-Kamta and early Assamese.

The emergence of Sankardev's Ekasarana Dharma in the 15th-century triggered a revival in language and literature.  Sankardev produced many translated works and created new literary forms—Borgeets (songs), Ankia Naat (one-act plays)—infusing them with Brajavali idioms; and these were sustained by his followers Madhavdev and others in the 15th and subsequent centuries. In these writings the 13th/14th-century archaic forms are no longer found. Sankardev pioneered a prose-style of writing in the Ankia Naat. This was further developed by Bhattadeva who translated the Bhagavata Purana and Bhagavad Gita into Assamese prose.  Bhattadev's prose was classical and restrained, with a high usage of Sanskrit forms and expressions in an Assamese syntax; and though subsequent authors tried to follow this style, it soon fell into disuse. In this writing the first person future tense ending -m (korim: "will do"; kham: "will eat") is seen for the first time.

Middle Assamese
The language moved to the court of the Ahom kingdom in the seventeenth century, where it became the state language.  In parallel, the proselytising Ekasarana dharma converted many Bodo-Kachari peoples and there emerged many new Assamese speakers who were speakers of Tibeto-Burman languages.  This period saw the emergence of different styles of secular prose in medicine, astrology, arithmetic, dance, music, besides religious biographies and the archaic prose of magical charms.

Most importantly this was also when Assamese developed a standardized prose in the Buranjis—documents related to the Ahom state dealing with diplomatic writings, administrative records and general history. The language of the Buranjis is nearly modern with some minor differences in grammar and with a pre-modern orthography. The Assamese plural suffixes (-bor, -hat) and the conjunctive participles (-gai: dharile-gai; -hi: pale-hi, baril-hi) become well established. The Buranjis, dealing with statecraft, was also the vehicle by which Arabic and Persian elements crept into the language in abundance.  Due to the influence of the Ahom state the speech in eastern Assam took a homogeneous and standard form. The general schwa deletion that occurs in the final position of words came into use in this period.

Modern Assamese
The modern period of Assamese begins with printing—the publication of the Assamese Bible in 1813 from the Serampore Mission Press.  But after the British East India Company (EIC) removed the Burmese in 1826 and took complete administrative control of Assam in 1836, it filled administrative positions with people from Bengal, and introduced Bengali language in its offices, schools and courts. The EIC had earlier promoted the development of Bengali to replace Persian, the language of administration in Mughal India, and maintained that Assamese was a dialect of Bengali. 
    
Amidst this loss of status the American Baptist Mission (ABM) established a press in Sibsagar in 1846 leading to publications of an Assamese  periodical (Orunodoi), the first Assamese grammar by Nathan Brown (1846), and the first Assamese-English dictionary by Miles Bronson (1863). The ABM argued strongly with the EIC officials in an intense debate in the 1850s to reinstate Assamese. Among the local personalities Anandaram Dhekial Phukan drew up an extensive catalog of medieval Assamese literature (among other works) and pioneered the effort among the natives to reinstate Assamese in Assam. Though this effort was not immediately successful the administration eventually declared Assamese the official vernacular in 1873 on the eve of Assam becoming a Chief Commissioner's Province in 1874.

Standardisation
In the extant medieval Assamese manuscripts the orthography was not uniform. The ABM had evolved a phonemic orthography based on a contracted set of characters.  Working independently Hemchandra Barua provided an etymological orthography and his etymological dictionary, Hemkosh, was published posthumously.  He also provided a Sanskritised approach to the language in his Asamiya Bhaxar Byakaran ("Grammar of the Assamese Language") (1859, 1873). Barua's approach was adopted by the Oxomiya Bhaxa Unnati Xadhini Xobha (1888, "Assamese Language Development Society") that emerged in Kolkata among Assamese students led by Lakshminath Bezbaroa. The Society published a periodical Jonaki and the period of its publication, Jonaki era, saw spirited negotiations on language standardization. What emerged at the end of those negotiations was a standard close to the language of the Buranjis with the Sanskritised orthography of Hemchandra Barua.

As the political and commercial center moved to Guwahati in the mid-twentieth century, of which Dispur the capital of Assam is a suburb and which is situated at the border between the western and central dialect speaking regions, standard Assamese used in media and communications today is a neutral blend of the eastern variety without its distinctive features. This core is further embellished with Goalpariya and Kamrupi idioms and forms.

Geographical distribution 
Assamese is native to Assam. It is also spoken in states of Arunachal Pradesh, Meghalaya and Nagaland. The Assamese script can be found in of present-day Burma. The Pashupatinath Temple in Nepal also has inscriptions in Assamese showing its influence in the past.

There is a significant Assamese-speaking diaspora worldwide.

Official status
Assamese is the official language of Assam, and one of the 22 official languages recognised by the Republic of India. The Assam Secretariat functions in Assamese.

Phonology
The Assamese phonemic inventory consists of eight vowels, ten diphthongs, and twenty-three consonants (including two semivowels).

Consonant clusters

Alveolar stops
The Assamese phoneme inventory is unique in the group of Indo-Aryan languages as it lacks a dental-retroflex distinction among the coronal stops as well as the lack of postalveolar affricates and fricatives. Historically, the dental and retroflex series merged into alveolar stops. This makes Assamese resemble non-Indic languages of Northeast India (such as Austroasiatic and Sino-Tibetan languages). The only other language to have fronted retroflex stops into alveolars is the closely related group of eastern dialects of Bengali (although a contrast with dental stops remains in those dialects).

Voiceless velar fricative
The use of the voiceless velar fricative is heavy in the eastern Assamese dialects and decreases progressively to the west—from Kamrupi to eastern Goalparia, and disappears completely in western Goalpariya.

Velar nasal
Assamese, Odia, and Bengali, in contrast to other Indo-Aryan languages, use the velar nasal (the English ng in sing) extensively. In many languages, while the velar nasal is commonly restricted to preceding velar sounds, in Assamese it can occur intervocalically. This is another feature it shares with other languages of Northeast India, though in Assamese the velar nasal never occurs word-initially.

Vowel inventory
Eastern Indic languages like Assamese, Bengali, Sylheti, and Odia do not have a vowel length distinction, but have a wide set of back rounded vowels. In the case of Assamese, there are four back rounded vowels that contrast phonemically, as demonstrated by the minimal set:  kola  ('deaf'),  kóla  ('black'),  kwla  ('lap'), and  kula  ('winnowing fan').  The near-close near-back rounded vowel  is unique in this branch of the language family. But in lower Assam, ও is pronounced same as অ' (ó).  kwla   mwr

Vowel harmony
Assamese has vowel harmony. The vowels [i] and [u] cause the preceding mid vowels and the high back vowels to change to [e] and [o] and [u] respectively. Assamese is one of the few languages spoken in India which exhibit a systematic process of vowel harmony.

Schwa deletion
The schwa in modern Assamese, represented by //, is generally deleted in the final position unless it is (1) /w/; or (2) /y/ after higher vowels like /i/ or /u/. The final schwa was not deleted in Early Assamese.  The initial schwa is never deleted.

Writing system

Modern Assamese uses the Assamese script. In medieval times, the script came in three varieties: Bamuniya, Garhgaya, and Kaitheli/Lakhari, which developed from the Kamarupi script. It very closely resembles the Mithilakshar script of the Maithili language, as well as the Bengali script. There is a strong literary tradition from early times.  Examples can be seen in edicts, land grants and copper plates of medieval kings.  Assam had its own manuscript writing system on the bark of the saanchi tree in which religious texts and chronicles were written, as opposed to the pan-Indian system of Palm leaf manuscript writing.  The present-day spellings in Assamese are not necessarily phonetic. Hemkosh, the second Assamese dictionary, introduced spellings based on Sanskrit, which are now the standard.

In the early 1970s, it was agreed upon that the Roman script was to be the standard writing system for Nagamese Creole.

Sample text 

The following is a sample text in Assamese of Article 1 of the Universal Declaration of Human Rights:

Assamese in Assamese alphabet

Assamese in WRA Romanisation
Prôthôm ônussêd: Zônmôgôtôbhawê xôkôlû manuh môrjyôda aru ôdhikarôt xôman aru sôtôntrô. Têû̃lûkôr bibêk asê, buddhi asê. Têû̃lûkê prôittêkê prôittêkôk bhratribhawê byôwôhar kôra usit.

Assamese in SRA Romanisation
Prothom onussed: Jonmogotobhabe xokolü manuh moirjjoda aru odhikarot xoman aru sotontro. Teü̃lükor bibek ase, buddhi ase. Teü̃lüke proitteke proittekok bhratribhawe bebohar kora usit.

Assamese in SRA2 Romanisation
Prothom onussed: Jonmogotovawe xokolu' manuh morjjoda aru odhikarot xoman aru sotontro. Teulu'kor bibek ase, buddhi ase. Teulu'ke proitteke proittekok vratrivawe bewohar kora usit.

Assamese in CCRA Romanisation
Prothom onussed: Jonmogotobhawe xokolu manuh morjyoda aru odhikarot xoman aru sotontro. Teulukor bibek ase, buddhi ase. Teuluke proitteke proittekok bhratribhawe byowohar kora usit.

Assamese in IAST Romanisation
Prathama anucchēda: Janmagatabhāve sakalo mānuha maryadā āru adhikārata samāna āru svatantra. Tēõlokara bibēka āchē, buddhi āchē. Tēõlokē pratyēkē pratyēkaka bhrātribhāvē byavahāra karā ucita.
Assamese in the International Phonetic Alphabet

Gloss
1st Article: Congenitally all human dignity and right-in equal and free. their conscience exists, intellect exists. They everyone everyone-to brotherly behaviour to-do should.

Translation
Article 1: All human beings are born free and equal in dignity and rights. They are endowed with reason and conscience. Therefore, they should act towards one another in a spirit of brotherhood.

Morphology and grammar
The Assamese language has the following characteristic morphological features:
 Gender and number are not grammatically marked.
 There is a lexical distinction of gender in the third person pronoun.
 Transitive verbs are distinguished from intransitive.
 The agentive case is overtly marked as distinct from the accusative.
 Kinship nouns are inflected for personal pronominal possession.
 Adverbs can be derived from the verb roots.
 A passive construction may be employed idiomatically.

Negation process
Verbs in Assamese are negated by adding  before the verb, with  picking up the initial vowel of the verb. For example:
  'do(es) not want' (1st, 2nd and 3rd persons)
  'will not write' (1st person)
  'will not nibble' (1st person)
  'does not count' (3rd person)
  'do not do' (2nd person)

Classifiers
Assamese has a large collection of classifiers, which are used extensively for different kinds of objects, acquired from the Sino-Tibetan languages. A few examples of the most extensive and elaborate use of classifiers are given below:
"zɔn" is used to signify a person, male with some amount of respect
E.g., manuh-zɔn – "the man"
"zɔni" (female) is used after a noun or pronoun to indicate human beings
E.g., manuh-zɔni – "the woman"
"zɔni" is also used to express the non-human feminine
E.g., sɔɹai zɔni –  "the bird", pɔɹuwa-zɔni – "the ant"
"zɔna" and "gɔɹaki" are used to express high respect for both man and woman
E.g., kɔbi-zɔna –  "the poet", gʊxaɪ-zɔna –  "the goddess", rastrapati-gɔɹaki – "the president", tiɹʊta-gɔɹaki – "the woman"
"tʊ" has three forms: tʊ, ta, ti
(a) tʊ: is used to specify something, although the case of someone, e.g., loɹa-tʊ – "the particular boy", is impolite
(b) ta: is used only after numerals, e.g., ɛta, duta, tinita – "one, two, three"
(c) ti: is the diminutive form, e.g., kesua-ti –  "the infant, besides expressing more affection or attachment to
"kɔsa", "mɔtʰa" and "taɹ" are used for things in bunches
E.g., sabi-kɔsa - "the bunch of key", saul-mɔtʰa – "a handful of rice", suli-taɹi or suli kɔsa – "the bunch of hair"
dal, dali, are used after nouns to indicate something long but round and solid
E.g., bãʱ-dal - "the bamboo", katʰ-dal – "the piece of wood", bãʱ-dali – "the piece of bamboo"

In Assamese, classifiers are generally used in the numeral + classifier + noun (e.g.  ejon manuh 'one man') or the noun + numeral + classifier (e.g.  manuh ejon 'one man') forms.

Nominalization
Most verbs can be converted into nouns by the addition of the suffix . For example,  ('to eat') can be converted to  khaon ('good eating').

Grammatical cases
Assamese has 8 grammatical cases:

Pronouns

m=male, f=female, n=neuter., *=the person or object is near., **=the person or object is far., v =very familiar, inferior, f=familiar, p=polite, e=ergative form.

Tense
With consonant ending verb likh (write) and vowel ending verb kha (eat, drink, consume).

For different types of verbs.

{{font|text=The negative forms are n + 1st vowel of the verb + the verb. Example: Moi porhw, Moi noporhw (I read, I do not read); Tumi khelila, Tumi nekhelila (You played, You didn't play). For verbs that start with a vowel, just the n- is added, without vowel lengthening. In some dialects if the 1st vowel is a in a verb that starts with consonant, ne is used, like, Moi nakhaw (I don't eat) is Moi nekhaü. In past continuous the negative form is -i thoka nasil-. In future continuous it's -i na(/e)thaki-. In present continuous and present perfect, just -i thoka nai and -a nai respectively are used for all personal pronouns. Sometimes for plural pronouns, the -hok suffix is used, like korwhok (we do), ahilahok (you guys came).Content|size=small}}

Relationship suffixes

Dialects

Regional dialects
The language has quite a few regional variations. Banikanta Kakati identified two broad dialects which he named (1) Eastern and (2) Western dialects, of which the eastern dialect is homogeneous, and prevalent to the east of Guwahati, and the western dialect is heterogeneous. However, recent linguistic studies have identified four dialect groups listed below from east to west:
 Eastern group in and around the undivided Sivasagar district (Golaghat, Jorhat, Majuli, Charaideo and Sivasagar) and the former undivided Lakhimpur district (Dibrugarh, Tinsukia, Lakhimpur and Dhemaji. Standard Assamese is based on the Eastern group.
 Central group spoken in Nagaon, Sonitpur, Morigaon districts and adjoining areas
 Kamrupi group in the Kamrup region: (Barpetia, Nalbariya, Palasbaria)
 Goalpariya group in the Goalpara region: (Ghulliya, Jharuwa, Caruwa)

Samples
Collected from the book, Assamese – Its formation and development. The translations are of different versions of the English translations:

Non-regional dialects
Assamese does not have many caste- or occupation-based dialects. In the nineteenth century, the Eastern dialect became the standard dialect because it witnessed more literary activity and it was more uniform from east of Guwahati to Sadiya, whereas the western dialects were more heterogeneous. Since the nineteenth century, the center of literary activity (as well as of politics and commerce) has shifted to Guwahati; as a result, the standard dialect has evolved considerably away from the largely rural Eastern dialects and has become more urban and acquired western dialectal elements. Most literary activity takes place in this dialect, and is often called the likhito-bhaxa, though regional dialects are often used in novels and other creative works.

In addition to the regional variants, sub-regional, community-based dialects are also prevalent, namely:
 Standard dialect influenced by surrounding centers.
 Bhakatiya dialect''' highly polite, a sattra-based dialect with a different set of nominals, pronominals, and verbal forms, as well as a preference for euphemism; indirect and passive expressions. Some of these features are used in the standard dialect on very formal occasions.
 The fisherman community has a dialect that is used in the central and eastern region.
 The astrologer community of Darrang district has a dialect called thar that is coded and secretive. The ratikhowa and bhitarpanthiya secretive cult-based Vaisnava groups too have their own dialects.
 The Muslim community have their own dialectal preference, with their own kinship, custom, and religious terms, with those in east Assam having distinct phonetic features.
 The urban adolescent and youth communities (for example, Guwahati) have exotic, hybrid and local slangs.
 Ethnic speech communities that use Assamese as a second language, often use dialects that are influenced heavily by the pronunciation, intonation, stress, vocabulary and syntax of their respective first languages (Mising Eastern Assamese, Bodo Central Kamrupi, Rabha Eastern Goalpariya etc.). Two independent pidgins/creoles, associated with the Assamese language, are Nagamese (used by Naga groups) and Nefamese (used in Arunachal Pradesh).

Literature

There is a growing and strong body of literature in this language. 
The first characteristics of this language are seen in the Charyapadas composed in between the eighth and twelfth centuries. The first examples emerged in writings of court poets in the fourteenth century, the finest example of which is Madhav Kandali's Saptakanda Ramayana. The popular ballad in the form of Ojapali is also regarded as well-crafted. The sixteenth and seventeenth centuries saw a flourishing of Vaishnavite literature, leading up to the emergence of modern forms of literature in the late nineteenth century.

See also
 Indo-Aryan languages
 Languages of India
 Languages with official status in India
 List of Indian languages by total speakers
 List of languages by number of native speakers
 Kamrupi litterateurs
 Assamese Language Movement
 Assamese people

Notes

References

 
 
 
 
 
 
 
 
 
 
 
 
 
 
 
 
 
 
 
 
 
 
 

External links

Assamese language at Encyclopædia Britannica'' 
Axamiyaa Bhaaxaar Moulik Bisar by Mr Devananda Bharali (PDF)
Candrakānta abhidhāna : Asamiyi sabdara butpatti aru udaharanere Asamiya-Ingraji dui bhashara artha thaka abhidhana. second ed. Guwahati : Guwahati Bisbabidyalaya, 1962.
A Dictionary in Assamese and English (1867) First Assamese dictionary by Miles Bronson from (books.google.com)
Assamese proverbs, published 1896

 
Eastern Indo-Aryan languages
Official languages of India
Languages of Bangladesh
Languages of Assam
Subject–object–verb languages
Indo-Aryan languages
Sahitya Akademi recognised languages